Alexander Perceval, (18218May 1866), sometimes spelt "Percival", was the third son of the late Colonel Alexander Perceval, Member of Parliament for County Sligo, and subsequently serjeant-at-arms to the House of Lords. His mother was Jane Anne, daughter of Colonel L'Estrange, of Moystown, Moystown, Cloghan, King's County, Ireland.

Biography 
Born in 1821, Perceval was a relative of Mary Jane Perceval, the wife of James Matheson, one of the founders of Hong Kong trading house Jardine, Matheson & Co. As a result, in 1850 he became a clerk in the firm and became a partner in 1853. By 1862 he had become Taipan of Jardine's and an unofficial member of the Legislative Council of the colony of Hong Kong from 1860 to 1864. He was also the first chairman of the Hong Kong General Chamber of Commerce. Having amassed a large fortune in the Far East, Perceval returned to Ireland in 1860, and purchased the paternal estate of Temple House from R. H. Hall-Dare, esq., of Newtonbarry, County Wexford, to whom it had been sold by Philip Perceval, esq., in 1857. He died at Temple House, County Sligo, aged 44.

Offspring 
Perceval's nineteen-month-old son Robert Jardine Percival died in May 1852 and is buried in a large chest tomb in the Hong Kong Cemetery.

Legacy 
Percival Street (sic) on Hong Kong Island is named after him.

References 

1821 births
1866 deaths
History of Hong Kong
Jardine Matheson Group
Members of the Legislative Council of Hong Kong